Philotas of Thebes a descendant of Argonaut Peneleos, followed the expedition of Athenians under the sons of King Codrus, and is said to be the founder of Priene in Ionia.

References
Pausanias (geographer). vii. 2. § 7 
Strabo  xiv. p., 633, &c.

Ancient Thebans
Boeotian mythology